SEU or Seu may refer to:

Universities
 Southeast University, Nanjing, Jiangsu Province, China
 Southeast University (Bangladesh), in Banani, Dhaka
 Southeastern University (disambiguation)
 St. Edward's University, Austin, Texas, USA
 Saudi Electronic University, Riyadh, Saudi Arabia

Other organisations
 Social Exclusion Unit, a British Government task force to address social exclusion
 Sindicato Español Universitario, a corporatist students' union in Francoist Spain
 Sustainable Energy Utility, a community based model of development based on energy conservation and community-scale renewables

Other
 single event upset, a change of state caused by a high-energy particle strike to a micro-electronic device
 slightly enriched uranium, a very low enrichment of uranium to 0.9% to 2% 235U.
 subjective expected utility, the attractiveness of an economic opportunity as perceived by a decision-maker in the presence of risk
 Shoot 'em up, a video game subgenre
 Source Entry Utility or Source Edit Utility, a tool to edit program sources on IBM RPG, IBM System/32, System Support Program, and IBM i

See also
 La Seu (disambiguation)